Anthony Lynch may refer to:

 Anthony Lynch (Gaelic footballer) (born 1977), Irish sportsperson
 Anthony Lynch (Dominican) (  1576–after 1636)